(French for Star of the North, i.e. the North Star) may refer to:

 L'Étoile du Nord, the motto of the U.S. state of Minnesota
 L'étoile du nord, an 1854 opéra comique in three acts by Giacomo Meyerbeer
 "L'Étoile du Nord", a short story by the francophone Belgian writer Georges Simenon
 L'étoile du nord (film), a 1982 French film directed by Pierre Granier-Deferre and based on the short story by Georges Simenon
 Étoile du Nord (train), which ran between Paris, Brussels and Amsterdam
 LGV Étoile du Nord, former name of a proposed high-speed rail line now known as LGV Picardie
 Theâtre de l'Étoile du Nord, a theatre in the centre of Tunis, Tunisia
 Etoile De Nord, a 19th-century racehorse sired by The Baron

See also

 
 Nord (disambiguation)
 Étoile (disambiguation)
 Polestar (disambiguation)
 Nordstar (disambiguation)
 Nordstern (disambiguation)
 Northstar (disambiguation)
 North Star (disambiguation)
 Northern Star (disambiguation)
 Star of the North (disambiguation)
 Estrela do Norte (disambiguation)
 Estrella del norte (disambiguation)